Paul Fritz Lohmann (5 February 1926 – 10 December 1995) was a cinematographer. In 1976, he won an Emmy for Outstanding Achievement in Cinematography for Entertainment Programming for a Special for Eleanor and Franklin, an award he shared with Edward R. Brown.

Filmography
Coffy (1973)
California Split (1974)
Trilogy of Terror (1975)
Nashville (1975)
Silent Movie (1976)
High Anxiety (1977)
Time After Time (1979)
Mommie Dearest (1981)
Looker (1981)
Masada (1981)
Endangered Species (1982)
The Dollmaker (1984)
Lust in the Dust (1985)

References 

1926 births
1995 deaths
People from New York (state)
Emmy Award winners
American cinematographers